The arrondissement of Lisieux is an arrondissement of France in the Calvados department in the Normandy region. It has 160 communes.

Composition

The communes of the arrondissement of Lisieux are:

 Ablon (14001)
 Amfreville (14009)
 Angerville (14012)
 Annebault (14016)
 Auberville (14024)
 Les Authieux-sur-Calonne (14032)
 Auvillars (14033)
 Barneville-la-Bertran (14041)
 Basseneville (14045)
 Bavent (14046)
 Beaufour-Druval (14231)
 Beaumont-en-Auge (14055)
 Belle Vie en Auge (14527)
 Benerville-sur-Mer (14059)
 Beuvillers (14069)
 Beuvron-en-Auge (14070)
 Blangy-le-Château (14077)
 Blonville-sur-Mer (14079)
 La Boissière (14082)
 Bonnebosq (14083)
 Bonneville-la-Louvet (14085)
 Bonneville-sur-Touques (14086)
 Bourgeauville (14091)
 Branville (14093)
 Le Breuil-en-Auge (14102)
 Le Brévedent (14104)
 Bréville-les-Monts (14106)
 Brucourt (14110)
 Cabourg (14117)
 Cambremer (14126)
 Canapville (14131)
 Castillon-en-Auge (14141)
 Cernay (14147)
 Clarbec (14161)
 Coquainvilliers (14177)
 Cordebugle (14179)
 Courtonne-la-Meurdrac (14193)
 Courtonne-les-Deux-Églises (14194)
 Cresseveuille (14198)
 Cricquebœuf (14202)
 Cricqueville-en-Auge (14203)
 Danestal (14218)
 Deauville (14220)
 Dives-sur-Mer (14225)
 Douville-en-Auge (14227)
 Dozulé (14229)
 Drubec (14230)
 Englesqueville-en-Auge (14238)
 Équemauville (14243)
 Escoville (14246)
 Fauguernon (14260)
 Le Faulq (14261)
 Fierville-les-Parcs (14269)
 Firfol (14270)
 La Folletière-Abenon (14273)
 Formentin (14280)
 Le Fournet (14285)
 Fourneville (14286)
 Fumichon (14293)
 Genneville (14299)
 Gerrots (14300)
 Glanville (14302)
 Glos (14303)
 Gonneville-en-Auge (14306)
 Gonneville-sur-Honfleur (14304)
 Gonneville-sur-Mer (14305)
 Goustranville (14308)
 Grangues (14316)
 Hermival-les-Vaux (14326)
 Hérouvillette (14328)
 Heuland (14329)
 Honfleur (14333)
 L'Hôtellerie (14334)
 Hotot-en-Auge (14335)
 La Houblonnière (14337)
 Houlgate (14338)
 Léaupartie (14358)
 Lessard-et-le-Chêne (14362)
 Lisieux (14366)
 Lisores (14368)
 Livarot-Pays-d'Auge (14371)
 Manerbe (14398)
 Manneville-la-Pipard (14399)
 Marolles (14403)
 Merville-Franceville-Plage (14409)
 Méry-Bissières-en-Auge (14410)
 Le Mesnil-Eudes (14419)
 Le Mesnil-Guillaume (14421)
 Le Mesnil-Simon (14425)
 Le Mesnil-sur-Blangy (14426)
 Mézidon Vallée d'Auge (14431)
 Les Monceaux (14435)
 Montreuil-en-Auge (14448)
 Moyaux (14460)
 Norolles (14466)
 Notre-Dame-de-Livaye (14473)
 Notre-Dame-d'Estrées-Corbon (14474)
 Orbec (14478)
 Ouilly-du-Houley (14484)
 Ouilly-le-Vicomte (14487)
 Pennedepie (14492)
 Périers-en-Auge (14494)
 Petiville (14499)
 Pierrefitte-en-Auge (14500)
 Le Pin (14504)
 Pont-l'Évêque (14514)
 Le Pré-d'Auge (14520)
 Prêtreville (14522)
 Putot-en-Auge (14524)
 Quetteville (14528)
 Ranville (14530)
 Repentigny (14533)
 Reux (14534)
 La Rivière-Saint-Sauveur (14536)
 Rocques (14540)
 La Roque-Baignard (14541)
 Rumesnil (14550)
 Saint-André-d'Hébertot (14555)
 Saint-Arnoult (14557)
 Saint-Benoît-d'Hébertot (14563)
 Saint-Denis-de-Mailloc (14571)
 Saint-Désir (14574)
 Saint-Étienne-la-Thillaye (14575)
 Saint-Gatien-des-Bois (14578)
 Saint-Germain-de-Livet (14582)
 Saint-Hymer (14593)
 Saint-Jean-de-Livet (14595)
 Saint-Jouin (14598)
 Saint-Julien-sur-Calonne (14601)
 Saint-Léger-Dubosq (14606)
 Saint-Martin-aux-Chartrains (14620)
 Saint-Martin-de-Bienfaite-la-Cressonnière (14621)
 Saint-Martin-de-la-Lieue (14625)
 Saint-Martin-de-Mailloc (14626)
 Saint-Ouen-le-Pin (14639)
 Saint-Philbert-des-Champs (14644)
 Saint-Pierre-Azif (14645)
 Saint-Pierre-des-Ifs (14648)
 Saint-Pierre-en-Auge (14654)
 Saint-Samson (14657)
 Saint-Vaast-en-Auge (14660)
 Sallenelles (14665)
 Surville (14682)
 Le Theil-en-Auge (14687)
 Le Torquesne (14694)
 Touffréville (14698)
 Touques (14699)
 Tourgéville (14701)
 Tourville-en-Auge (14706)
 Trouville-sur-Mer (14715)
 Val-de-Vie (14576)
 Valorbiquet (14570)
 Valsemé (14723)
 Varaville (14724)
 Vauville (14731)
 La Vespière-Friardel (14740)
 Victot-Pontfol (14743)
 Vieux-Bourg (14748)
 Villers-sur-Mer (14754)
 Villerville (14755)

History

The arrondissement of Lisieux was created in 1800. At the January 2017 reorganisation of the arrondissements of Calvados, it gained 15 communes from the arrondissement of Caen.

As a result of the reorganisation of the cantons of France which came into effect in 2015, the borders of the cantons are no longer related to the borders of the arrondissements. The cantons of the arrondissement of Lisieux were, as of January 2015:

 Blangy-le-Château
 Cambremer
 Dozulé
 Honfleur
 Lisieux 1st Canton
 Lisieux 2nd Canton
 Lisieux 3rd Canton
 Livarot
 Mézidon-Canon
 Orbec
 Pont-l'Évêque
 Saint-Pierre-sur-Dives
 Trouville-sur-Mer

Sub-prefects 
 Robert Miguet :  1959

References

Lisieux
Lisieux